The Schwarze Laber is a river in Bavaria, Germany, and a left tributary of the Danube. Its source is near Neumarkt in der Oberpfalz. It is approx. 78 km long. It flows southeast through the small towns Parsberg, Beratzhausen, Laaber and Deuerling. It flows into the Danube in Sinzing.

References
Franz X. Bogner: Die Schwarze Laber aus der Luft. Luftbildband, Stiftung Schwarze Laber, Parsberg 2014, .

Rivers of Bavaria
Tributaries of the Danube
Rivers of Germany